Persona 4: Dancing All Night is a rhythm video game developed and published by Atlus for the PlayStation Vita. The game is a spin-off of the 2008 role-playing game, Persona 4, which is part of the Persona anthology of Megami Tensei games. The game was released in Japan in June 2015, in North America in September 2015, and in Europe in November 2015, receiving generally positive reviews from critics. A port for the PlayStation 4 was included with the Endless Night Collection of Persona 3: Dancing in Moonlight and Persona 5: Dancing in Starlight.

Gameplay
Persona 4: Dancing All Night is a rhythm game in which the characters of Persona 4 dance to music from the Persona series, including original and rearranged songs. The game is split into two main modes; Story, where the players experience the game's story which is split up by various music stages, and Free Dance, in which players can pick any song they have unlocked and perform at various difficulties, unlocking more songs by clearing each stage.

The game is played using six face buttons; the up, left, and down directional buttons and the triangle, circle, and cross buttons, and the analogue sticks. As each stage plays, notes will appear from the center of the screen, requiring the player to hit the corresponding button in time with the music. Some notes require the player to hit two buttons at the same time, or hold the button down the duration of the note. In addition to the notes, Scratch Rings appear which require the player to flick either analogue stick to hit. Although missing Scratch Rings will not count as a miss, hitting enough pink Fever Rings will allow players to enter Fever Mode during certain parts of each song, allowing them to earn more points. The player's success is represented by a Hype Gauge at the top of screen, with the song ending in failure if it drops too low, or is not at a high enough level by the end of the song. If the player's Hype Gauge is high enough upon entering Fever Mode, Bond Fever will activate and a partner character may join the main character in their dance.

Upon clearing a song, players receive in-game money which they can use to purchase new items, costumes, and accessories. Some items may only be unlocked after clearing certain requirements, such as clearing a certain number or songs or making a certain amount of purchases. Costumes and accessories can be used to customise each character's appearance during their songs in Free Dance mode. Items, on the other hand, can be used to alter the gameplay to make it easier or more challenging, which in turn increases or decreases the score and money earned from each level. Additional songs, costumes, and accessories can be purchased as downloadable content.

Story

The story is framed as a tale that Margaret is telling to an unseen visitor in the Velvet Room about her guest, Yu Narukami.

Roughly a month following the epilogue of Persona 4 Golden, Rise Kujikawa, who has since returned to the idol industry, asks Yu Narukami and all her other friends to dance alongside her in the upcoming Love Meets Bonds Festival. As Yu, along with Naoto Shirogane, join up with Rise at her dance studio and are introduced to fellow idol Kanami Mashita, they learn that Kanami's idol group, Kanamin Kitchen, has mysteriously gone missing. Looking into a rumor concerning a video that shows up on the LMB website at midnight, allegedly showing a dead idol, Yu, Rise, and Naoto check out the video themselves and are sucked into the Midnight Stage, a world separate from the TV world they are used to. There, they discover a mysterious entity is using strange ribbons and a song to force Shadows to form a bond with her, effectively brainwashing anyone who comes into contacts with the ribbons. Unable to use violence in this world, the group discover that they can use the power of song and dance to express their feelings to the Shadows, freeing them from the voice's control.

The next day, as the rest of the Investigation Team are assembled at the dance studio, the mysterious voice attempts to pull Kanami into the Midnight Stage, but ends up grabbing producer Kyoka Ochimizu instead. Following in after them, the Investigation Team split up in order to rescue the captured members of Kanamin Kitchen as the voice attempts to force a fake bond with them. As each member is rescued and taken to a safe dressing room, the team discover pages from a diary. Coming across Ochimizu as well, the group deduce that the world is somehow tied to Yuko Osada, an idol who committed suicide years ago, while the Shadows they encounter are people who got dragged into the world after watching the video. Back in the real world, Kanami comes across Ryotaro and Nanako, who become curious about the whereabouts of Yu and the others. As Ryotaro helps Kanami look into the strange circumstances surrounding the incident, Nanako is recognised for her dancing talent and is chosen to appear alongside Kanami in the LMB Festival. During this time, Kanami experiences painful flashbacks as she ponders over the lyrics of her upcoming song, "Calystegia", which was originally intended for Yuko. To her shock, Kanami eventually discovers that the diary she had been carrying all this time belonged to Yuko, who she had witnessed killing herself when she came to the studio to audition years ago. Traumatized over the repressed memories, Kanami is overcome by despair and pulled into the Midnight Stage.

Back in the Midnight Stage, Ochimizu, who was Yuko's producer back when she was alive, is swayed by the voice but brought to her senses by Yu and the others. Discovering the song sung by the Shadows to be a reversed recording of Calystegia, the team discover the voice to be a Shadow version of Kanami, who has pulled the real Kanami, along with the entire LMB audience, into the Midnight Stage. Although the team manage to save Kanami and bring her to her senses, the Shadow Kanami, revealed to be a god of desire named Mikuratana-no-Kami, bonds itself with the rest of the audience. Determined to get their feelings across, Rise combines her strength with Kanami and the Kanamin Kitchen girls to power up her Persona, Himiko, transforming it into a giant stage for Yu and the others to express themselves. Finally understanding their feelings, Mikuratana-no-Kami releases everyone and returns them to the real world, where Kanami prepares to finish off the festival with a performance of Calystegia.

Post credits, it is revealed that the actual events behind the festival have been covered up, thanks in large part due to the efforts of Ochimizu, and Dojima, despite the police's disapproval. The audience, and the general public, is fooled into thinking the events were caused by a combination of special effects, technical malfunctions, publicity stunts, and staged skits (helped by the lack of clear memories of the LMB audience). Furthermore, the experiences of those who were pulled into the Midnight Stage as shadows was put down to mass induced hysteria. With things now back to normal, Rise is able to make her career comeback.

The epilogue concludes with Margaret telling the unseen visitor that their purpose in visiting the Velvet Room was to learn this tale about the value of bonds, so that they can pass it onto other people. As the unseen visitor leaves, she tells them to not worry about Yu and his friends as "their journey will never end".

Development
Persona 4: Dancing All Night was announced alongside Persona 5 and Persona Q: Shadow of the Labyrinth during an Atlus event in Japan on November 24, 2013. The game was being primarily developed by Dingo Inc., noted for their work on the Hatsune Miku: Project DIVA series. Later in 2014, due to quality concerns Atlus's P-Studio team took over main development, with Dingo being retained as a supporting developer. A North American release was later announced for 2015. During Tokyo Game Show 2014, it was announced that the Japanese version would also be released in 2015, when it was previously announced to be released in Fall 2014. On June 28, 2015, it was announced that NIS America would be publishing the game in Europe in Fall 2015. Following this announcement, Bandai Namco announced on their official Twitter account that the game would also be released in Australia and New Zealand on November 5, 2015. Rise Kujikawa is played by Ashly Burch in the game due to conflicting schedules which prevented Laura Bailey, Rise's English voice actress in previous Persona games, from reprising her role.

The soundtrack was supervised and directed by series regular, Shoji Meguro, with original compositions by Ryota Kozuka. The game features over 30 tracks, including remixes of previous songs in the franchise by other musicians such as Tetsuya Komuro, Daisuke Asakura, Shinichi Osawa, Towa Tei, De De Mouse, Narasaki, Banvox, Norihiko Hibino, Yuu Miyake, Akira Yamaoka, and Lotus Juice. The game features multiple playable characters, including all eight members of Persona 4s Investigation Team, along with Nanako Dojima, Margaret and Kanami Mashita from Persona 4, the lattermost of whom being playable for the first time. Additionally, the Persona 4 character Tohru Adachi and the Persona 4 Golden character Marie are available through downloadable content. An additional DLC track features Vocaloid character Hatsune Miku as a playable character, being only voiced in Japanese.

Reception 

The Japanese video game magazine Famitsu gave the game the review score 33 of 40, consisting of the sub-scores 8, 8, 8, and 9. Heath Hindman of PlayStation LifeStyle gave the game 8 out of 10, praising the soundtrack and unique feel of the game. The game sold 94,036 physical retail copies within its debut week of release within Japan, placing second within the Japanese software sales charts for that particular week. IGN awarded it 8.4 out of 10, saying "Persona 4: Dancing All Night highlights the wonderful music from the Persona series while building a solid story".

However, Heidi Kemps of GameSpot gave the game a 5 out of 10, and stated that "Dancing All Night might have sounded like a fun idea on paper, but it simply doesn’t hold a candle to better portable rhythm games." She also stated that the "story is disappointing, the gameplay is mediocre, and the only thing that really feels fun is playing dress-up with characters and their various outfits."

Sequels 
Beginning development simultaneously following the success of Dancing All Night, the team intended to make refinements to both gameplay and graphics. Initially wanting to work on a game based on Persona 3, the development of Persona 5 and fan anticipation encouraged them to make games based on both titles. Because of this, they decided to release the games simultaneously. A major difference is the lack of a story mode, with rhythm sequences instead taking place within the events of Persona 3 and Persona 5 around character-based interactions. The games, titled Persona 3: Dancing in Moonlight and Persona 5: Dancing in Starlight, were released for the PlayStation 4 and PlayStation Vita in 2018.

Notes

References

External links
 

2015 video games
Atlus games
Bandai Namco games
Bones (studio)
Music video games
Nippon Ichi Software games
PlayStation Vita games
PlayStation 4 games
Persona (series)
Video games set in Japan
Video games developed in Japan
Video games set in 2012